Paul Healion (3 June 1978 - 16 August 2009) was an Irish racing cyclist from Dunboyne, Co. Meath.

In 2000 and 2008 he was the National Time Trial Champion. In 2001 he won his first National Criterium Championships. He won the event again in 2009 during a spell of superb form.

Healion died on the evening of 16 August 2009 after his car, in which he was alone, crashed near Ardee, Co Louth. He leaves a widow, Ann. He had been due to ride the Tour of Ireland stage race the following weekend as part of the Irish Cycling Team.

Major results

1998
3rd, Irish National Time-trial (10 mile) Championship (CN)
2000
1st,  Irish National Time-trial Championship (CN)
2001
1st,  Irish National Criterium Championship (CN)
2002
5th, Irish National Time-trial Championship (CN)
2003
3rd, Irish National Time-trial Championship (CN)
5th, Irish National Criterium Championship (CN)
2004
1st, Irish National Elite Track Pursuit Championship (CN)
3rd, Irish National Criterium Championship (CN)
4th, Irish National Time-trial Championship (CN)
2005 – Driving Force Logistics
5th, Irish National Time-trial Championship (CN)
2006 – Team Murphy&Gunn-Newlyn
1st overall, Ras Mumhan
1st, Stage 3a
2nd, Stage 4
2nd, Stage 2
2nd, Irish National Time-trial Championship (CN)
6th, Stephen Roche GP
2007 – Murphy & Gunn-Newlyn–M Donnelly–Sean Kelly Team
1st, Stage 4, Ras Mumhan
2nd, Irish National Time-trial Championship (CN)
2nd, Lincoln International Grand Prix
3rd overall, Tour of Ulster
1st, Stage 3
1st, Stage 4
4th, Irish National Time-trial Championship (CN)
2008 – Pezula Cycling Team
1st,  Irish National Time-trial Championship (CN)
36th overall, FBD Insurance Rás (2.2) (riding for McNally Swords)
8th, Stage 8
2009
1st,  Irish National Criterium Championship (CN)
5th, Tour of Blackpool (riding for Irish National Team)
11th, Irish National Road Race Championship (CN)
43rd overall, FBD Insurance Rás (2.2) (riding for Irish National Team)
1st, Stage 6
4 other Top 10 stage placings

References

1978 births
2009 deaths
Irish male cyclists
Road incident deaths in the Republic of Ireland